Jo Mi-ryung or Jo Mi-ryeong is a Korean name and may also refer to:

 Jo Mi-ryeong (actress, born 1929), South Korean actress
 Jo Mi-ryung (actress, born 1973), South Korean actress